was an admiral in the Imperial Japanese Navy, and briefly served as Navy Minister in the 1940s.

Biography
Nomura was born in Hioki, Kagoshima prefecture. He graduated from the 35th class of the Imperial Japanese Naval Academy on 20 November 1907, ranked 43rd out of 172 cadets. After completing naval artillery and basic torpedo training, he was assigned to the battleship , and was promoted to sub-lieutenant on 1 December 1910.

Nomura subsequently served on a large number of vessels in the early Japanese navy, including the gunboat , cruiser , the gunboat  and cruiser .

Promoted to lieutenant on 1 December 1913, he was assigned to the destroyer Yayoi, followed by the destroyers , and his first command, the destroyer . Nomura was promoted to lieutenant commander on 1 December 1919. He graduated from the Naval Staff College with honors in 1920. He subsequently served in a number of staff positions, including that of naval attaché to Germany from August 1922 to September 1924. After his return to Japan, he was promoted to commander on 1 December 1924.

In April 1927, Nomura was part of the Japanese delegation to the Geneva Naval Conference. He became a captain on 10 December 1928, and assumed command of the submarine tender  in December 1928. Nomura visited Germany again during most of 1929, and was part of the Japanese delegation to the London Naval Treaty talks. After his return to Japan, he assumed command of the cruiser , followed by the aircraft carrier  from February 1932-October 1933. In 1934, he was Commandant of the Submarine School.

Nomura was promoted to rear admiral on 15 November 1934. As rear admiral, he served in numerous staff positions within the Imperial Japanese Navy General Staff, including head of Naval Intelligence in 1937. He was promoted to vice admiral on 15 November 1938. He served as commander in chief of the 3rd Fleet from November 1939-September 1940.

Nomura was sent as naval liaison to Europe as part of Japan's participation in the Tripartite Pact from November 1940 to August 1943, and was stationed as naval attaché in Berlin. During his time in Germany, he was active in attempting to procure the latest in military technology for Japan, especially with regards to developments pertaining to submarines and aircraft.

After his return to Japan, Nomura was briefly commander in chief of the Kure Naval District. On 1 March 1944, he was promoted to admiral.

He served as Naval Minister in the cabinet of Prime Minister Hideki Tōjō for only five days, from 17–22 July 1944.

In the final stages of the Pacific War, he served as commander in chief of the Yokosuka Naval District and of the Maritime Escort Fleet. He entered the reserves on 15 October 1945 and died at the age of 88 in 1973.

Nomura was the center of a controversy in 1971, when he headed a group of Japanese war veterans in an attempt to recover the destroyer  after it had been sold for scrap by the Republic of China Navy. He only managed to recover the steering wheel.

References

Bibliography

External links
 Bio Entry on Naval History.com
 Combined Fleet.com on RO-500
 "World Battlefronts: Admirals' Week" Time magazine, July 24, 1944

1885 births
1973 deaths
Imperial Japanese Navy admirals
Military personnel from Kagoshima Prefecture
Japanese admirals of World War II
Ministers of the Imperial Japanese Navy